The Downtown Transit Tunnel is a planned light rail tunnel in Downtown Austin, Texas. It is a core feature of Project Connect, the transit expansion plan being undertaken by the Capital Metropolitan Transportation Authority. The transit tunnel would serve the Orange, Blue, and (eventually) Gold light rail lines.

Route
The tunnel is planned to initially facilitate both the Blue and Orange Lines. The tunnel would run under Guadalupe street from Cesar Chavez street to at least 14th street, as well as under 4th street from Guadalupe to Trinity street. If the project is eventually built out to its full plan, another tunnel would be dug under Trinity street from Cesar Chavez street to 14th street to serve the Gold Line.

Tunneling length was initially anticipated to be  in length. By 2021, planners were considering moving the Orange Line's southern portal to near Lively Middle School at Leland Street, potentially adding a further  in length, citing engineering challenges with emerging close to Lady Bird Lake and the topography of South Congress hill.

Stations
The plan proposes multiple underground stations for the light rail lines, at locations including Republic Square, Downtown Station, Government Center, Auditorium Shores, Congress Avenue, and Rainey/MACC.

The underground stations will vary in size, with Republic Square or Downtown Station being the largest, and all other stations being smaller. Large stations such as Republic Square will have three levels/floors (sorted from shallowest to deepest): a level containing a food court, mezzanine with a performance stage for local music, and pedestrian tunnels to provide access to other buildings in Downtown, a middle level containing small shops and restaurants, public restrooms, and seating, and the deepest level containing the platform for boarding trains. All underground stations will be fully climate-controlled, and will utilize technologies such as platform screen doors on the platform level to assist with climate control and enhance passenger safety.

References

External links
Project Connect — Transit Tunnel

Capital Metro
Public transportation in Texas
Proposed railway lines in Texas
2028 in rail transport
Railway tunnels in the United States
Buildings and structures in Austin, Texas
Rail transportation in Austin, Texas